Bongo is a surname. Notable people with the name include:
 Ali Bongo (magician) (1929–2009), British comedy magician
 Ali Bongo Ondimba (born 1959), current president of Gabon and son of Omar Bongo
 Amba Bongo, writer and advocate
 Bongani Bongo, South African politician
 Christ Bongo (born 1976), Congolese football striker
 Edith Lucie Bongo (1964–2009), First Lady of Gabon from 1989 to 2009
 Martin Bongo (born 1940), Gabon political figure and diplomat
 Omar Bongo (1935–2009), former president of Gabon
 Pietro Bongo (died 1601), renaissance Italian writer

See also
 Bongo (disambiguation)#People
 Bonga (disambiguation)
 Mbongo (disambiguation)